Crush is the sixth studio album by English electronic band Orchestral Manoeuvres in the Dark (OMD), released on 17 June 1985 by Virgin Records. It is the first of two OMD studio albums to be produced by Stephen Hague. Aimed primarily at the US market, Crush is notable for moving the group towards a more polished sound, although elements of earlier experimentation are still present. During recording the band employed a greater use of organic instrumentation than in the past.

Crush was completed within a limited timescale, with group members later expressing regret over not challenging label-enforced time constraints. The hectic recording and promotion schedule served to diminish morale among the band, who also had reservations about Hague's sleek production. Crush nevertheless received critical acclaim in the UK and became OMD's only top-40 album on the US Billboard 200. It remained on Canada's RPM chart for 43 weeks from 13 July 1985 to 17 May 1986. Three singles were taken from the record; "So in Love" became the group's first hit on the US Billboard Hot 100, where it peaked at number 25.

A long-form video, Crush: The Movie, was also released, showing the group discussing their career and performing the songs from the album.

Background

With OMD's Gramophone Suite studio now dismantled, the band commenced work at the more sophisticated Amazon Studios (also in Liverpool) in late 1984. The group booked Amazon for two months and tried to embrace a more relaxed, almost spontaneous approach to songwriting. Bandleaders Andy McCluskey and Paul Humphreys averaged a new composition every two days, with much of the lyrical content coloured by McCluskey's blossoming relationship with girlfriend (and future wife) Toni. OMD continued to make use of the Fairlight CMI sampler keyboard, which had been introduced on predecessor Junk Culture (1984). The group employed a greater use of organic instrumentation during the sessions, as many of the Fairlight-generated sounds came to be replaced by the live playing of Martin Cooper and Malcolm Holmes (and session musicians Graham and Neil Weir). Humphreys explained, "We were looking for a more band-type sound, since a lot of people have been telling us for ages that they like the way we sound on stage."

As OMD set their sights on breaking America, Virgin Records suggested American producer Stephen Hague, of whom the band were fans. The group began recording with Hague in spring 1985 at The Manor, Shipton-on-Cherwell. Hague would heavily influence the feel of Crush, employing a meticulous approach and largely streamlining the band's sound. OMD had reservations about Hague's production, which McCluskey felt approached "dullness"; Humphreys admitted publicly at the time, "It's a little smoother than we would have done it ourselves." Mixing was completed at Advision, London. The pressure of finishing the album on time, while working 19-hour days in a basement room with "very peculiar acoustics", served to damage rapport between the exhausted group members.

Despite its polished sound, the album features elements of the band's trademark early experimentation. Sampling was extensively used on both the title track and "The Lights Are Going Out", with the former utilising tuned snippets of Japanese television commercials recorded by McCluskey; Humphreys' then-wife Maureen provided additional vocals on both songs. Elsewhere, "88 Seconds in Greensboro" was inspired by a TV documentary about the Greensboro massacre of 1979, and was recorded in one live take. "Hold You" was considered as the follow-up single to "So in Love", and a music video was made, but the group ultimately reneged on the idea. Other tracks considered for inclusion were "Heaven Is" and "Southern". The title Crush refers to the number of love songs on the record.

Cover art
OMD intended to use a painting by American artist Edward Hopper for the sleeve art. Martin Kirkup, the band's then-manager, stated, "I remember Andy McCluskey telling me the reason he wanted a Hopper-style painting on the cover of Crush was that he had always felt there was a lot of melancholy in the paintings of Hopper and he felt that it matched the melancholy that was in the songs." After learning of the enormous fees required to reproduce Hopper's work, the group instead hired artist Paul Slater to imitate Hopper's style (in conjunction with XL Design). Slater based his artwork on Hopper's Early Sunday Morning (1930).

Critical reception

Crush met with critical acclaim in the UK. It received five-star ratings from Debbi Voller of Number One and Robin Smith at Record Mirror, the former writing, "Crush... is a collection of remarkable songs. Each one has a life and mood of its own and OMD have cleverly combined atmosphere with instant appeal." Melody Makers Helen Fitzgerald named Crush the best OMD album to date, adding, "As a pop record it's sublime, intricate and unyieldingly persuasive, it doesn't give up its secrets lightly and the excitement is in the chase." Ian Cranna of Smash Hits said the album delivers "what OMD do best – strong, melodic songs – in a more lush, er, orchestral setting while retaining that passionate punch... it's the welcome return of the thinking person's dance music." The Guardians Robin Denselow stated that the group are "playing it safe" on Crush, but are "still able to roll out the strong melodies" and "swirling pretty songs".

Cashbox noted the "accessible" nature of Crush, whose increased use of organic instrumentation yields a "warmer, more inviting sound than [on] previous outings". Glen Gore-Smith of the Winnipeg Free Press wrote, "On Crush, the band has found a missing link between pop art and commerce. And, rather than compromising itself, OMD maneuvers with integrity." The Calgary Heralds James Muretich said of the record, "It emphasizes danceable electro-pop at the expense of experimentation... Crush won't bowl one over, but will seduce one gradually with its elegance and wit." Len Righi of The Morning Call suggested that fans of the group's earlier output "may be shaking their heads... Which is not to say the songs aren't catchy or well-crafted."

In a retrospective review, AllMusic journalist Dave Connolly unfavourably compared Crush to previous OMD efforts, observing a "lightweight" album that "represents a nearly complete reinvention of the band's original ideals." On the other hand, the record was awarded a full five stars in the All Music Guide to Rock (2002), where editor Stephen Thomas Erlewine asserted that it "may be less adventurous than [OMD's] earlier work" but is still a "thoroughly winning album". Trouser Press saw Crush as the beginning of a sustained shift toward the mainstream for OMD, but allowed that the record "isn't half-bad". Paul Evans of Rolling Stone wrote, "With Crush, pure, luscious melody rules. Disowned (of course) by the band's cult, Crush is OMD at its most purely pop—'So in Love' and 'Secret' are flawless."

Legacy
The Gavin Report ranked Crush 11th in its "Alternative Top 100" of 1985, while CMJ placed the record 10th in its "Top 20 Most-Played Albums" of the year. Critic Kevin Bell, in listing the 10 best records of 1985 for The Brandon Sun, named Crush as one of 10 honourable mentions to narrowly miss a placing. "88 Seconds in Greensboro", which addresses the Greensboro massacre of 1979, became the subject of an article in The Charlotte Observer. Crush later ranked 23rd in a Slicing Up Eyeballs reader poll of 1985's best albums, and was placed at no. 141 in CMJ's "Top 1000, 1979–1989".

Kevin Hearn of rock group Barenaked Ladies recalled "loving" the record. He added, "The title track, with its wonderfully strange sequence of samples, particularly appealed to my expanding musical tastes." Humphreys feels "there's some nice things on [Crush]", although he and McCluskey have expressed regret over not challenging label-enforced time constraints. McCluskey also believes that the album's production does not sound like OMD. Considerable resources were expended on trying to make Crush a success in the US, Humphreys noting, "We had a saying: 'In trying to break America, America broke us'... We got the success we craved, but we exhausted ourselves getting it." Morale would continue to fracture during the making of 1986 follow-up The Pacific Age (also produced by Hague), preceding a line-up split in the late 1980s.

Track listing

Personnel
Credits are adapted from the liner notes of Crush.

Orchestral Manoeuvres in the Dark
 Paul Humphreys – vocals; electronic keyboards; piano
 Andy McCluskey – vocals; guitar; bass guitar; electronic keyboards
 Malcolm Holmes – drums; electronic and acoustic percussion
 Martin Cooper – vocals; saxophone; electronic keyboards

Additional musicians
 Stephen Hague – electronic keyboards; guitar
 Graham Weir – trombone; electric guitar
 Neil Weir – trumpet
 Maureen Humphreys – additional vocals

Charts

Weekly charts

Year-end charts

Certifications

References

External links
 Album lyrics
 

1985 albums
Albums produced by Stephen Hague
Orchestral Manoeuvres in the Dark albums
Virgin Records albums